Francesco Carlà is an Italian journalist, professor, investor and entrepreneur.

Among the various activities in the financial field, he is known to the public to be the founder and CEO of the software house Simulmondo, the videogame leader in Italy at the turn of the 80s and 90s.

Biography 
His career started in 1983, when he began working for television and radio broadcasts, including Mediaset and Rai, as an expert in computer technologies and softwares.

He conduct the TV program "Videogames Weekend" for Rai 2.

After graduating with the first thesis on videogames history in the world, he began to work in the videogame field. Initially he wrote for several years on a column on MCmicrocomputer magazine. Subsequently, in 1987, he founded Simulmondo, one of the first videogame software houses in Italy.

In the following years, he will also be known for being a producer of several videogames, including "Bocce", knows as the first Italian videogame and some series of graphic adventures starring Diabolik, Dylan Dog, Tex and Spiderman.

Overall, the company will produce about 150 videogames in just over 10 years.

In 1995 he began to take an interest in online finance, creating a free financial newsletter. Noting the interest from the financial newsletter members, in 1999 he founded FinanzaWorld.

Since 2000 he has published several books, mainly in the economic-financial field, and since 2005 he has been dealing with some columns, this time in newspapers such as Panorama and L'Espresso.

For three years he was among the authors and the host of Netstocks, on the satellite channel RaiNews24, a television column dedicated to the New Economy.

He also edited the Soldi e felicità (Money and Happiness) section for the Italian edition of Vanity Fair.

He was a professor in Theories and Techniques of New Media, eCulture and Financial Communication at the IULM University until 2008  and he was professor of Communication Systems and Technologies at Sapienza University in Rome from 1996 to 2002.

Video games 
The list can be consulted in the following page, Simulmondo titles,  in every title he the director/producer, and in many games like I Play: 3D Soccer, Simulman and SoccerChamp he was also the creator.

Books 

 Space Invaders. La vera storia dei videogames, Interaction libri, 1993
 Space Invaders. La vera storia dei videogames, seconda edizione, Castelvecchi Edizioni, 1996
 Trading online. La guida. I principi della finanza democratica. Dal Nasdaq al nuovo mercato, Apogeo, 2000
 Simulmondo, Apogeo, 2001
 Italia-google. Alla ricerca dell'innovazione digitale, Edizioni FAG, 2006
 La Finanza Democratica. La guida completa per diventare investitori intelligenti, Edizioni Sonda, 2009

See also 

 Simulmondo

References

Bibliography
AA.VV., Annuario dei giornalisti italiani 2012, Ordine dei Giornalisti, 2012, p. 686.

Living people
20th-century Italian businesspeople
20th-century Italian journalists
Italian male journalists
Italian company founders
Year of birth missing (living people)
21st-century Italian journalists
Academic staff of the IULM University of Milan
Academic staff of the Sapienza University of Rome
20th-century Italian male writers